Angel Stoyanov, born June 23, 1958 in Samokov, is a Bulgarian ski jumper. He came in 49th place in both the normal hill (70 m) and large hill (90 m) ski-jump events at the 1984 Winter Olympics in Sarajevo.

References

External links 

Bulgarian male ski jumpers
Olympic ski jumpers of Bulgaria
Ski jumpers at the 1984 Winter Olympics
Living people
People from Samokov
Year of birth missing (living people)
Sportspeople from Sofia Province